Canada  hosted and participated in the 2010 Winter Olympics in Vancouver, British Columbia. Canada previously hosted the 1976 Summer Olympics in Montreal and the 1988 Winter Olympics in Calgary. Canada sent a team of 206 athletes (116 men, 90 women), including participants in all 15 sports, and finished with 14 gold medals and 26 in total (ranking 1st and 3rd respectively), surpassing their previous best medal performance at the 2006 Winter Olympics. The 14 gold medals also set the all-time record for most gold medals at a single Winter Olympics, one more than the previous record of 13 set by the former Soviet Union in 1976 and Norway in 2002. This record was matched at the 2018 PyeongChang Games when Germany and Norway tied it, and broken at the 2022 Beijing Games by Norway. Canada was the first host nation to win the gold medal count at a Winter Olympics since Norway at the 1952 Winter Olympics.

Brian McKeever became the first Canadian athlete to be named to both Paralympic and Olympic teams, although he did not compete in the Olympic Games.

Medalists

| width="78%" align="left" valign="top" |

| width="22%" align="left" valign="top" |

Preparation

In May 2009, a motion for the Canadian Olympic team to wear seal skin on their uniforms was unopposed in Canadian parliament. The motion read: "That, in the opinion of the House, the government should take advantage of the opportunity provided by the 2010 Vancouver Olympic Games to promote seal products, particularly by studying the possibility of using these products in the making of the Canadian Olympic clothing." The motion was proposed by Raynald Blais of the Bloc Québécois in protest of the European Parliament's passing of a bill to ban the import of seal products. Canadian Olympic Committee chief executive officer Chris Rudge quickly dismissed the idea, saying "It would be inappropriate for us and I think it would be inappropriate to use the athletes as a voice for issues that accrue to other elements to our society."

Own the Podium program

After Canadian athletes failed to obtain a gold medal in either the 1976 or 1988 Olympics, of which Canada were hosts, the Canadian Olympic Committee pledged to make Canada the top medal winning nation at 2010. They started the Own the Podium program and the Canadian government invested $120 million into the program.

Hockey uniform controversy
Since 1994, Canadian national hockey team players have worn uniforms that feature the logo of Hockey Canada, the governing body of the sport in Canada. The International Olympic Committee (IOC) does not allow the use of national federation logos, but did not strictly enforce the rule until the 2008 Summer Olympics. Canadian hockey teams used the Hockey Canada logo at the 1998, 2002 and 2006 Winter Olympics, because the IOC does allow an exemption if the nation's National Olympic Committee approves. The Canadian Olympic Committee (COC) chose not to support an exemption. Chris Rudge, the COCs chief executive officer, said "[Hockey Canada] is discontent is that we're not going the extra mile to go for an exemption for [them] ... but it's not our fight, it's the IOC's rule, and Hockey Canada knew this was coming. [...] We got directives on the summer uniforms two years ago, and we shared it then with the winter sports. We told them we didn't have the directives for winter sports at that time, but they had to know it was coming. … We let them know it would be a harder issue than before." Hockey Canada executives, concerned that they would lose money through apparel sales, unsuccessfully protested the decision. Bob Nicholson, president of Hockey Canada, said "The COC is supposed to lead Canada into the Olympics and hopefully this isn't the way the COC is going to lead us over the next 13 months. [...] I just wish they would support us at the IOC level and they did not do that and I don't like that type of teammate." A new design was unveiled on 17 August 2009. According to Nicholson, the new jerseys will only be used in the 2010 tournament, and players will use the old version at other international tournaments.

Alpine skiing

The Canadian alpine skiing team is guaranteed 14 athletes, which is down from the original 22 (the maximum number a NOC may enter). The International Ski Federation (FIS) announced that the number of overall alpine skiers would be limited to 320, and that some of the guaranteed spots would go to smaller nations, so that there will be a more international field. Canada was originally guaranteed 14 skiers, although the number was later raised to 18, and can still enter a full team of 22 if other athletes meet the qualification standards. Gary Allan, president of Alpine Canada, felt that Canada should be allowed 22, arguing that television coverage and crowd reception will be better. Canada was allowed a team of 19 skiers, which was announced on 27 January 2010. That number was later increased to 22 when other nations were unable to fill their quotas.

Prior to the announcement of the team, several athletes thought to be medal contenders were injured severely enough to keep them out of the Olympics, including 2009 world downhill champion John Kucera, Kelly VanderBeek, François Bourque and Jean-Philippe Roy.

Men

Women

Biathlon

Canada sent eight biathletes to Vancouver. Canada had four individual entries in women's events but only one individual entry in men's events. However, as the host nation Canada was allowed to send a men's relay team. The men's team comprised Jean Philippe Leguellec, Marc-André Bédard, Brendan Green and Robin Clegg. The women's team, meanwhile, comprised Zina Kocher, Megan Imrie, Megan Tandy and Rosanna Crawford.

Bobsleigh

As the host nation, Canada was guaranteed an entry in all three events (two-man, two-woman and four-man). Canada's full 12 athlete team was announced on 27 January 2010.

Cross-country skiing

The 11 athlete team was announced on 22 January 2010. The team consisted of Ivan Babikov, George Grey, Alex Harvey, Devon Kershaw, Stefan Kuhn, Brian McKeever, 2006 gold medalist Chandra Crawford, Daria Gaiazova, Perianne Jones, 2006 silver medalist Sara Renner and Madeleine Williams. Brian McKeever, who is legally blind, competed at the 2002 and 2006 Winter Paralympics in both cross-country skiing and biathlon. He won four gold medals (two at each Games) in cross-country skiing as well as a silver and a bronze in biathlon. He would have been the first athlete in Olympic history ever to compete in the Winter Olympics after participating in the Paralympics. Four more cross-country skiers were announced on 27 January 2010: Drew Goldsack, Brent McMurtry, Gordon Jewett and Brittany Webster.

Men

Women

Curling

Canada qualified both a men's and women's team. The representatives were decided at the 2009 Canadian Olympic Curling Trials, held 6–13 December 2009, in Edmonton. Brad Gushue and his team, the gold medalists in the men's tournament in 2006, were unable to qualify for the trials, and did not get the chance to defend their gold medal. In the men's tournament, Canada was represented by the team of Kevin Martin, John Morris, Marc Kennedy and Ben Hebert. This was the second Olympic tournament for Martin, who won a silver medal at the 2002 Winter Olympics. In the women's tournament, the team of Cheryl Bernard, Susan O'Connor, Carolyn Darbyshire and Cori Bartel participated.

Summary

Men's tournament

Standings

Round-robin
Canada had a bye in draws 3, 7 and 11.

Draw 1
Tuesday, 16 February, 09:00

Draw 2
Tuesday, 16 February, 19:00

Draw 4
Thursday, 18 February, 09:00

Draw 5
Thursday, 18 February, 19:00

Draw 6
Friday, 19 February, 14:00

Draw 8
Saturday, 20 February, 19:00

Draw 9
Sunday, 21 February, 14:00

Draw 10
Monday, 22 February, 09:00

Draw 12
Tuesday, 23 February, 14:00

Semifinal
Thursday, 25 February, 14:00

Gold medal game
Saturday, 27 February, 15:00

Women's tournament

Standings

Round-robin
Canada had a bye in draws 3, 5 and 7.

Draw 1
Tuesday, 16 February, 14:00

Draw 2
Wednesday, 17 February, 09:00

Draw 4
Thursday, 18 February, 14:00

Draw 6
Friday, 19 February, 19:00

Draw 8
Sunday, 21 February, 09:00

Draw 9
Sunday, 21 February, 19:00

Draw 10
Monday, 22 February, 14:00

Draw 11
Tuesday, 23 February, 09:00

Draw 12
Tuesday, 23 February, 19:00

Semifinal
Thursday, 25 February, 09:00

Gold medal game
Friday, 26 February, 15:00

Freestyle skiing

The full 18 athlete freestyle skiing team was announced on 24 January 2010. Dave Duncan was originally named to the men's ski cross team, but he broke his collarbone during a training run at the Olympics and was unable to compete. Brady Leman was named his replacement. However, Leman aggravated a broken tibia he suffered in 2009, and also did not compete. Replacing both of them was Davey Barr.

Moguls and aerials

Ski cross

Figure skating

Canada qualified two athletes or pairs in each of the four events for a total of 12 athletes. Participants were decided at the 2010 Canadian Figure Skating Championships.

Ice hockey

National teams are co-ordinated by Hockey Canada and players are chosen by the team's management staff. The men's and women's national teams both qualified for the 2010 Winter Olympics.

With Vancouver being home to the Canucks, the 2010 Winter Olympics were the first to take place in an NHL market since the league started allowing its players to compete in the games in 1998 in Nagano, Japan.

Men's tournament

A group of about 45 players were invited to an orientation camp in August 2009 (although players not invited could also have been named to the team) and the final 23 man roster was announced on 30 December 2009. The team was coached by Mike Babcock and included assistant coaches Ken Hitchcock, Lindy Ruff and Jacques Lemaire.

Roster

Group play
Canada played in Group A.
Round-robin
All times are local (UTC-8).

Standings

Final rounds
Qualification playoff

Quarterfinal

Semifinal

Gold medal game

Women's tournament

In March 2009, the national team staff named 22 players to the 2009 World Championship team, as well as four additional players who would not compete in 2009 but could potentially be included in the Olympic roster. The final roster of 21 players was announced on 21 December 2009. Brianne Jenner, Jocelyne Larocque, Delaney Collins, Jennifer Wakefield and Gillian Ferrari were included in the centralized roster, but were cut before the Olympics. The team, which includes 14 Olympic veterans and seven players making their Olympic debut, is coached by Melody Davidson.
Roster

Group play
Canada played in Group A.
Round-robin
All times are local (UTC-8).

Standings

Final rounds
Semifinal

Gold medal game

Luge

Canada's Olympic luge team, announced on 19 December 2009, in Whistler, British Columbia, consisted of ten athletes: six individual competitors and two teams for the doubles event. The women's team consisted of Alex Gough, Regan Lauscher and Meaghan Simister. The men's singles team will comprise Sam Edney, Jeff Christie and Ian Cockerline. For the men's doubles event, two teams participated: Chris & Mike Moffat; and Tristan Walker & Justin Snith. The Fast Track Group, the title sponsor of the team, announced that they would give $1 million (which would be split between the athlete and Canadian Luge Federation) to any athlete that won a gold medal. The company also offered $50,000 for a silver and $5,000 for a bronze.

Nordic combined

Canada sent a single athlete, Jason Myslicki, to compete in the Nordic combined.

Note: 'Deficit' refers to the amount of time behind the leader a competitor began the cross-country portion of the event. Italicized numbers show the final deficit from the winner's finishing time.

Short track speed skating

As the host nation, Canada can send a full team of five men and five women for short track speed skating. Charles Hamelin finished third overall at the 2009 World Short Track Speed Skating Championships and was guaranteed a spot in the 2010 team by Speed Skating Canada. At the Canadian short-track speedskating trials, Jessica Gregg, Marianne St-Gelais, Kalyna Roberge and Tania Vicent earned spots on the women's team and Olivier Jean and Guillaume Bastille earned spots on the men's team with their performances. Valérie Maltais and François Hamelin were added to the women's and men's teams respectively as discretionary picks by the coaches. François-Louis Tremblay was unable to participate in the trials due to an ankle injury, but was given a bye and was named to the team. The number of skaters that will participate in each event will be determined by the team's performances at the first three World Cup events for the 2009–10 season.

Men

Women

Skeleton

Canada's full six athlete team was announced on 27 January 2010.

Ski jumping

Canada's ski jumping team comprised Stefan Read, Mackenzie Boyd-Clowes, Trevor Morrice and Eric Mitchell. None of them reached the final.

Snowboarding

Jasey-Jay Anderson secured an Olympic berth in the Parallel Giant Slalom by winning the event at the 2009 FIS Snowboarding World Championships. The full 18 athlete team was announced on 25 January 2010.

Halfpipe

Parallel GS

Key: '+ Time' represents a deficit; the brackets indicate the results of each run.

Snowboard cross

Speed skating

Canada's speed skating team consisted of eight men and eight women. Canadian speed skaters participated in every event, with the exception of the men's 10,000 m. The team was named on 11 January 2010.

Men

Women

Team pursuit

See also

 Canada at the 2010 Winter Paralympics

References

External links

 CTV Olympics – Media broadcaster
 2010 Winter Olympics at Olympic.ca

Nations at the 2010 Winter Olympics
2010
2010 in Canadian sports